The 2023 Arizona Tennis Classic was a professional tennis tournament played on hard courts. It was the third edition of the tournament which was part of the 2023 ATP Challenger Tour. It took place in Phoenix, United States between 13 and 19 March 2023.

Singles main draw entrants

Seeds

 1 Rankings are as of 6 March 2023.

Other entrants
The following players received wildcards into the singles main draw:
  Matteo Berrettini
  Gaël Monfils
  Diego Schwartzman

The following players received entry into the singles main draw as alternates:
  Radu Albot
  Matteo Arnaldi
  Nuno Borges
  Thanasi Kokkinakis
  Denis Kudla
  Christopher O'Connell
  Roman Safiullin
  Zhang Zhizhen

The following players received entry from the qualifying draw:
  Pavel Kotov
  Aleksandar Kovacevic
  Emilio Nava
  Alexander Shevchenko
  Jan-Lennard Struff
  Aleksandar Vukic

The following players received entry as lucky losers:
  Mattia Bellucci
  Rinky Hijikata

Champions

Singles

  Nuno Borges def.  Alexander Shevchenko 4–6, 6–2, 6–1.

Doubles

  Nathaniel Lammons /  Jackson Withrow def.  Hugo Nys /  Jan Zieliński 6–7(1–7), 6–4, [10–8].

References

Arizona Tennis Classic
Sports competitions in Phoenix, Arizona
2023 in American tennis
March 2023 sports events in the United States